Leutnant Julius Schmidt was a World War I flying ace credited with 15 confirmed and three unconfirmed aerial victories.

Biography
See also Aerial victory standards of World War I

Julius Schmidt was serving with Kampfgeschwader 4 (Tactical Bomber Wing 4) when he downed his first enemy aircraft on 12 May 1916. He would transfer to a fighter squadron, Jagdstaffel 3. While with them, he would destroy an observation balloon on 26 April 1917, then reel off a string of a dozen more victories by 11 September. On the 24th, he was severely wounded and removed from duty. Upon recovery, he would be transferred to Jagdstaffel 6. He scored no further victories with them, and may not have been on flying status.

Sources of information

References

 Above the Lines: The Aces and Fighter Units of the German Air Service, Naval Air Service and Flanders Marine Corps, 1914–1918. Norman Franks, Frank W. Bailey, Russell Guest. Grub Street, 1993. , .

 Albatros Aces of World War 1: Part 1 of Albatros aces of World War I. Norman L. R. Franks. Osprey Publishing, 2000. , .

1944 deaths
Year of birth missing
German World War I flying aces